The Italian Hindu Union (UII) is an association representing Hinduism in Italy.

The UII was founded in 1996, under the leadership of Swami Yogananda Giri and the cooperation of the Indian Embassy in Rome.

In 2007 the association, which represents a large chunk of Italy's 115,000 Hindus, signed an agreement with the Italian government, in accordance with article 8 of the Italian Constitution (which regulates the relations with religious minorities), and the agreement became law in 2012.

See also
Hinduism in Italy
Eight per thousand

References

External links
Official website

Hindu organisations based in Italy
1996 establishments in Italy
Religious organizations established in 1996